Robiquetia pantherina is a species of orchid endemic to the Philippines.

pantherina